Senecio brasiliensis, known by the common name flor-das-almas, (flower-of-souls), is a perennial species of the genus Senecio and family Asteraceae. It is native to fields and meadows of central South America.

Description

Leaves and stems:  S. brasiliensis stands very upright with a branched hairless and grooved stem.  The leaves are alternate, pinnate and deeply lobed dark green on the top, whitish green on the underside.
The lower part of the plant is smooth, while the upper part is hairy and the leaves cluster at the highest point with the flower stalks (corymbs).

Flowers: Yellow flowers dense on corymbs; two types of flowers (that look like [petal]s), disc florets with both male and female flowers and ray flowers which are simply female.

Seeds: Small seed with white hairs that use the wind to get around with.

Common Names

Guarani: Agosto poty (August flower)

Distribution

Native: Argentina (mostly North Argentine Northwest and Gran Chaco), Bolivia, Brazil (mostly South Central), Paraguay, and Uruguay.

Current:
America
North America: Alabama, Florida
South America: Argentina, Bolivia, Brazil, Paraguay, Uruguay
Europe
South-West Europe: Portugal

Predators
Phaedon confinis (Chrysomelidae)
Atarsocoris brachiariae  (Hemiptera: Cydnidae) – Burrowing brown bug

References

External links

brasiliensis